The 1993 Sandown 6 Hour was an endurance race for production cars which was staged at Sandown Raceway, near Melbourne in Victoria, Australia on Sunday, 21 February 1993. The race was won by Peter Fitzgerald and Brett Peters, driving a Porsche 968 CS.

Classes
Cars competed in six classes:
 Class A
 Class B
 Class C
 Class D
 Class S
 Class T

The defining parameters of the six classes have not yet been ascertained.

Qualifying
The fastest lap in Qualifying was set by Gregg Hansford, driving a Mazda RX-7, with a lap time of 1:25.06.

Results

 Race time of winning car: 6-00:09.72
 Fastest race lap: 1:25.84 – Bowe/Waldon (Mazda RX-7)

References

Further reading
 Sandown Shakedown, Sydney Morning Herald, 19 February 1993, page 39

Motorsport at Sandown
Sandown 6 Hour